The 2018 French motorcycle Grand Prix was the fifth round of the 2018 MotoGP season. It was held at the Bugatti Circuit in Le Mans on 20 May 2018.

Classification

MotoGP

Moto2

Moto3

Championship standings after the race

MotoGP

Moto2

Moto3

Notes

References

France
Motorcycle Grand Prix
French motorcycle Grand Prix
French motorcycle Grand Prix